Suzanne Ingrid Dorée is a professor of mathematics at Augsburg University, where she is also chair of the Department of Mathematics, Statistics, and Computer Science,.  She is chair of the Congress of the Mathematical Association of America and, as such, serves on its board of directors and the Section Visitors Program (Invited Speakers). Her doctoral research concerned group theory; she has also published in mathematics education.

Education and career
Dorée grew up near New York City, and did her undergraduate studies at the University of Delaware. She joined the Augsburg university faculty in 1989, and did her graduate studies at the University of Wisconsin–Madison. She completed her Ph.D. at the University of Wisconsin–Madison in 1996; her dissertation, supervised by Martin Isaacs, was Subgroups with the Character Restriction Property and Normal Complements.

Recognition
In 2004, Dorée won a Distinguished Teaching Award from the Mathematical Association of America. In 2019, Dorée won a Deborah and Franklin Tepper Haimo Award from the Mathematical Association of America.

References

Year of birth missing (living people)
Living people
20th-century American mathematicians
21st-century American mathematicians
American women mathematicians
University of Delaware alumni
University of Wisconsin–Madison alumni
Augsburg University faculty
20th-century women mathematicians
21st-century women mathematicians
20th-century American women
21st-century American women